The Northern Cape Department of Environment and Nature Conservation is the department of the Government of the Northern Cape. It is responsible for protecting, conserving and improving the Northern Cape's environment and natural resources. The political head of the department is MEC Mase Manopole. Manopole also oversees the Department of Agriculture, Land Reform and Rural Development.

References

External links
Official website

Government of the Northern Cape
Environment of South Africa
Environment ministries
Environmental agencies in South Africa
Northern Cape